Master Scuba Diver (MSD) is a scuba diving certification or recognition level offered by several North American diver training agencies, such as the National Association of Underwater Instructors (NAUI), the Professional Association of Diving Instructors (PADI), Scuba Diving International (SDI), and Scuba Schools International (SSI). Other agencies (e.g., The International Association of Nitrox and Technical Divers) offer similar programs under other names, such as "Elite Diver". Each of these (and other) agencies touts their program at this level as the highest, non-leadership program.

Most organizations have a minimum age requirement of 15 to undertake the Master Scuba Diver course, although some organizations do permit certification of "Junior" Master Scuba Divers.

Methodology 
Different agencies take different approaches to this program creating both a disparate level of indicated diver competence both within most agencies as well as from agency to agency. The specific methodologies of the main agencies are as follows:

IANTD 
IANTD awards their Elite Diver Recognition to a diver who completes:

 IANTD Advanced Open Water Diver.
 Three IANTD specialties: Deep, EANx, Rescue and Navigation.
 Any two other IANTD specialties.

NAUI 
The NAUI Master Scuba Diver course is one of such courses offered by the major North American diver training organizations that is designed with both a skill based and academic core. The NAUI Master Scuba Diver course was specifically designed by two NAUI Instructors: Paul Heinmiller (NAUI 5141L) and Phil Sharkey (NAUI 4505L), to meet a specific need that had been identified by the NAUI membership: a clearly defined course that provides, tests for, and certifies to, all the academic and skill training required of a NAUI Instructor, excepting topics covering teaching theory and methods and supervision of students and certified divers, topics that are part of NAUI's Divemaster and/or Instructor Training Course. The NAUI Master Scuba Diver course involves specific training in the theory and practice of:
 Emergency procedures and rescue
 Deep/simulated decompression diving
 Limited visibility or night diving
 Underwater navigation
 Search and recovery – light salvage

PADI 

PADI awards their Master Scuba Diver Recognition to a diver who completes:

 PADI Advanced Open Water Diver course or equivalent
 PADI Rescue Diver course
 EFR Emergency First Response course
 any Five different PADI specialty diving courses (not counting the Rescue Diver or EFR course)
 Logs 50 dives

SDI 
SDI awards their Master Scuba Diver Recognition  rating to a diver who completes:

 SDI Advanced Open Water Diver course
 SDI Rescue Diver course
 Completion of 4 SDI, TDI, or ERDI Specialty Courses or equivalent; only 1 course without dives, may be credited towards the master diver development program, with the exception of nitrox
 Logs 50 dives

SSI 
SSI awards their Master Diver Recognition to any diver who completes:

 any four different SSI Specialty Diving courses
 SSI Diver Stress & Rescue course
 Logs 50 dives

Footnotes

Diving qualifications